Stig Arild Råket (born 6 April 1978) is a Norwegian footballer, with a past in Molde, Bodø/Glimt and Kristiansund BK.

Career
Råket played 46 matches, scoring three goals, for Molde from 2000 to 2004 before he joined Bodø/Glimt in 2005. Halfway through the 2006-season, Bodø/Glimt experienced ecomic difficulties, and released a number of players including Råket. He then joined Kristiansund BK, where he played till he retired.

After his retirement, he worked for Molde at the youth academy, before he worked with youth development in Nordmøre og Romsdal Fotballkrets. In December 2010, Råket returned to Molde's academy and was also working as an assistant coach in Kristiansund BK.

References

External links
100% Fotball - Norwegian Premier Leagyue stats

1978 births
Living people
Politicians from Kristiansund
Norwegian footballers
Eliteserien players
Molde FK players
FK Bodø/Glimt players
Kristiansund BK players
Molde FK non-playing staff

Association football midfielders